{{DISPLAYTITLE:C9H10FN3O3}}
The molecular formula C9H10FN3O3 (molar mass: 227.19 g/mol, exact mass: 227.0706 u) may refer to:

 Dexelvucitabine
 Elvucitabine

Molecular formulas